The Empress of China is a 1953 German comedy film directed by Steve Sekely and starring Grethe Weiser, Nadja Tiller and Joachim Brennecke.

It was shot at the Spandau Studios and on location at Wannsee in Berlin. The film's sets were designed by the art directors Karl Schneider and Kurt Herlth.

Cast
 Grethe Weiser as Tante Clementine
 Nadja Tiller as Viktoria
 Joachim Brennecke as Heinrich Morland
 Ernst Waldow as Professor Mirrzahler
 Edith Schollwer as Frau Lose
 Kurt Vespermann as Herr Lose
 Ruth Stephan
 Erich Fiedler
 Ursula Herking
 Hans Zesch-Ballot as Dr. Stansberg
 Maria Zach
 Rolf Weih as Dr. Müller
 Wolfgang Neuss as Wonderful
  as Wanderstein
 Heinz Holl
 Gerd Vespermann
 Peter Lehmbrock
 Herbert Weissbach
 Joe Furtner
 Lys Assia as Sängerin
 Ilja Glusgal as Sänger
 Harold Horn as Dancer
 Liane Müller as Dancer
 Ursula Voß

References

Bibliography

External links 
 

1953 films
1953 comedy films
German comedy films
West German films
1950s German-language films
Films directed by Steve Sekely
Films based on German novels
German black-and-white films
Films shot at Spandau Studios
1950s German films